The Heather Formation is a geological formation occurs in the North Sea, offshore the United Kingdom and Norway. It preserves fossils from the Bathonian to Oxfordian  stages of the Middle to Late Jurassic period and was deposited in an open marine depositional environment.

See also

 List of fossiliferous stratigraphic units in Norway

References
 

Jurassic Norway